This articles presents the discography of American contemporary gospel duo Mary Mary.

Albums

Studio albums

Compilation albums

Holiday albums

Singles

As a lead artist

As a featured artist

Music videos

Notes

References

Discographies of American artists
Christian music discographies
Discography